Sean Murphy (born 8 January 1995) is a Scottish footballer who plays as a midfielder for Tranent Juniors.

Career
Murphy started his career in the youth academy of Livingston but was released in 2014 by then Livi manager John McGlynn.

He signed for Leith Athletic following his release from Livi and was part of the side that won the King Cup in 2015–2016.

Following a successful spell at Leith Athletic, Murphy signed for Musselburgh Athletic in 2016. During his two seasons at the Burgh, Murphy caught the eye of then Berwick Rangers manager Robbie Horn who signed him for the 2018–2019 season. He made his debut for the Wee Gers in a 4-0 Scottish League Cup defeat against Annan on 17 July 2018.

Murphy signed for Tranent Juniors in 2019 and went on to be part of the season to win the 2021–22 East of Scotland Football League.

Honours
 Tranent Juniors
East of Scotland Football League : 2021–22

References

External links
Sean Murphy on Soccerbase

1995 births
Living people
Scottish footballers
Scottish Football League players
Association football midfielders
Livingston F.C. players
Leith Athletic F.C. players
Musselburgh Athletic F.C. players
Berwick Rangers F.C. players
Tranent Juniors F.C. players